The Ali Gholi Agha hammam is a historical hammam in the Bidabad district of Isfahan, Iran. The hammam was built in 1713 by Ali Gholi Agha, who was a courtier of two Safavid kings Suleiman I and Sultan Husayn. Its architectural style is Isfahani and it was built in the late Safavid era. The structure consists of one large hammam and a small hammam and also a Howz. Each of these hammams consists of a dressing room and a Garmkhaneh (hothouse), so that they could be used in that time separately by men and women. At present, the structure is a museum and can be visited by tourists.

Ali Gholi Agha and his brother Khosro Agha, who built Khosro Agha hammam, were two well-known benefactors in that time.

See also
List of the historical structures in the Isfahan province

References

Buildings and structures in Isfahan
Tourist attractions in Isfahan Province
National works of Iran
Public baths in Iran